The Ehrenberg-Bass Institute for Marketing Science is the world’s largest centre for research into marketing. Based at the University of South Australia in Adelaide, Ehrenberg-Bass is an independent, not-for-profit research institute. Previously named the Marketing Science Centre, it was elevated to institute status in 2005. It is the first university institute devoted to marketing science. It was renamed after two marketing academics, Professor Andrew Ehrenberg and Professor Frank Bass. During their careers, both Ehrenberg and Bass have championed the development of simple generalised laws that can be described mathematically and can be widely applied.

Books and Publications 
The Ehrenberg-Bass Institute has published several business books and an academic textbook, including International bestseller How Brands Grow which has received acclaim from industry and academia.

The Institute’s books are:

 How Brands Grow: what marketers don’t know - Professor Byron Sharp (Oxford University Press, 2010)
 How Brands Grow Part 2 - Professor Jenni Romaniuk and Professor Byron Sharp (Oxford University Press, 2015, revised in 2021)
 Building Distinctive Brand Assets - Professor Jenni Romaniuk (Oxford University Press, 2018)
 Marketing: Theory, Evidence, Practice - Professor Byron Sharp (Oxford University Press, 2017)

Ehrenberg-Bass Sponsors
The program of R&D into marketing was established to research some of the fundamental issues of marketing and buyer behaviour. Pooled contributions from Sponsors fund the Institute.

Specialist Research Services
Ehrenberg-Bass specialises in research tools that are underpinned by robust evidence, especially related to what is necessary for profitable brand growth. The Institute focuses on research outcomes, recommendations and insights that are immediately useful for developing a business and marketing strategy. 

Some of the core research services offered by Ehrenberg-Bass are:

 Distinctive Asset Measurement
 Laws of Growth Analysis
 Identifying and Prioritising Category Entry Points
 Brand Metrics Review

Wharton Business School Collaboration
The Institute Director Professor Byron Sharp, co-hosted an advertising conference with Professor Yoram (Jerry) Wind from The Wharton School in the US in December 2008. The conference explored the digital revolution within advertising and how advertising may work in the future. The event was attended by over 100 senior advertising professionals. The conference lead to a special edition of the Journal of Advertising Research which was released in June 2009. The Institute is collaborating with The Wharton School's 'Future of Advertising' project and the Advertising Research Foundation in 2012 for a follow-up to the 2008 conference which will feature research on multi-media orchestrated advertising.

References

University of South Australia
Research institutes in Australia
Market research organizations
Research institutes established in 2005
2005 establishments in Australia
Marketing in Australia